The Alatyr in East Slavic legends and folklore is a sacred stone, the "father to all stones", the navel of the earth, containing sacred letters and endowed with healing properties. Although the name Alatyr appears only in East Slavic sources, the awareness of the existence of such a stone exists in various parts of the Slavdom. It is often mentioned in stories and referred to in love spells as "a mighty force that has no end."

On it stands the World tree. The stone is endowed with healing and magical properties. Spiritual verses describe how "from under the white-alatyr-stone" flows a miraculous source that gives the whole world "food and healing." The Alatyr is guarded by the wise snake Garafena and the bird Gagana.

Etymology 

The stone is usually called Alatyr, Alabor, Alabyr or Latyr and sometimes white stone or blue stone. Alatyr has an uncertain etymology. The name has been compared to the word "altar" and to the town of Alatyr. According to Oleg Trubachyov, the word alatyr is of Slavic origin and is related to the Russian word for amber: янтарь yantar.

According to Roman Jakobson in a review of Max Vasmer's :

In literature 
In Russian folklore it is a sacred stone, the “father to all stones”, the navel of the earth, containing sacred letters and endowed with healing properties. Although the name Alatyr appears only in East Slavic sources, the awareness of the existence of such a stone exists in various parts of the Slavdom. It is often mentioned in stories, and is referred to in love spells as "a mighty force that has no end."

Dove book

In Polish folk culture and language the stone is located on the borderline of the worlds, beyond the places of human residence. On the stone, things are happening related to change or the state of waiting for it. It symbolizes the center of the world and the transition from one world to another, it is related to the dead and evil spirits. In folklore this stone is named white stone, cerulean stone, grey stone, golden stone, sea stone, heavenly/paradisiac stone, and less often black stone. White stone together with water and a tree is in a sacred place. It is connected with fertility (a girl is waiting on a stone for a boy or waiting with him, waiting for her state to change, lovers are parting, etc.), death (Jesus dies on the stone) and lies somewhere far away (behind the city, behind the village, in paradise). The golden stone occurs mainly in wedding and love songs, less often others and usually occurs with a lily (wedding flower). God's feet are stones on which Jesus, Mary, Mother of God or the saints left their footprints, handprints or traces of objects (e.g. Mary tripped and left a mark on the stone; St. Adalbert taught on the stone and left a trace of footprints). These stones are directly called altars, sacrifices are made on them, are built into churches or church altars; they are considered sacred and have healing powers. In Polish folklore there is also the devil's stone and as such it does not appear in cultures other than Slavic. This stone lies abroad in distant lands, but instead of prosperity brings misfortune. The folklore does not speak about the origin of the stone but about the fact that it was brought by the devil to demolish a church, castle or other building.

In popular culture 
 The Legend of the Young Boyar Duke Stepanovich (In that rich India ...) (Duke Stepanovich)

Poem by K. D. Balmont, Alatyr Stone (1906)
Short story by Yevgeny Zamyatin, Alatyr  (1914)

Ancient Slav tales tell of "the white burning stone on Buyan", possibly referring to Alatyr.

In Latvian, Belarusian and Russian healing charms, a raven is invoked as a helping animal: it is called upon to take away the disease from the patient, fly away to the ocean and place the illness on a white or gray stone. In a Russian charm, this stone is explicitly called "Latyr-stone".

See also 
 Atar
 Foundation Stone

References

Bibliography

Further reading

External links 
 
 
  

Russian mythology
Mythological objects